Mohammad Mehedi Hasan Mithu is a Bangladeshi footballer who plays as a defender for Bangladesh Premier League club Mohammedan SC and the Bangladesh national team. As a versatile defender, Mithu can play as a centre-back, right back or left back. He is also an active soldier for the Bangladesh Army.

References 

1994 births
Living people
Bangladeshi footballers
Association football defenders
Muktijoddha Sangsad KC players
Abahani Limited (Chittagong) players
Mohammedan SC (Dhaka) players
Bashundhara Kings players
Bangladesh Football Premier League players
Bangladesh international footballers